Black Chew Head in Saddleworth in the Metropolitan Borough of Oldham is the highest point or county top of Greater Manchester in northern England.

Historically in the West Riding of Yorkshire (along with the rest of Saddleworth), it became a county top in 1974 on the creation of Greater Manchester following the Local Government Act 1972.

Location and access 
Black Chew Head is an outlying part of Black Hill, meaning Kinder Scout is its parent peak. It overlooks the Chew Valley, which leads eastwards and northwards to Dovestones Reservoir, and the valley of Crowden Great Brook leading south to Longdendale. The hill is accessible by many routes: the most used and most obvious is from Dovestones Reservoir in Greenfield via the Chew Reservoir access road. The hill is also accessible from Crowden in Derbyshire and from the A635 to the north. The Pennine Way runs just to the east of the summit on its way from Crowden to Black Hill. The summit lies a short distance east of the June 2018 wildfire on Saddleworth Moor, but was not within the burned area.

References

External links 
 Black Chew Head, England. Peakbagger.com.
 Black Chew Head. Fen Running and Fell Walking.
 Black Chew Head. My Pennines.

Mountains and hills of Greater Manchester
Mountains and hills of the Peak District
Geography of the Metropolitan Borough of Oldham
Highest points of English counties
Saddleworth